Kola Bay or Murmansk Fjord is a 57-km-long fjord of the Barents Sea that cuts into the northern part of the Kola Peninsula. It is up to 7 km wide and has a depth of 200 to 300 metres. The Tuloma, Rosta and Kola Rivers discharge into the bay.

The eastern shore is craggy and precipitous, the western one is comparatively level. The ports of Murmansk and Severomorsk sit on the east side. Polyarny, the main base of Russia's Northern Fleet, is on the west side of the bay.

Semidiurnal tides in the Murmansk Fjord are as high as 4 metres. In winter, the southern part of the bay may be covered in ice. The Kola Bay Bridge spans the Kola Bay near its southern end

See also
List of fjords of Russia

Notes 

 This article is based on a translation of the equivalent article of the Russian Wikipedia on 13 July 2008.

Bays of the Barents Sea
Fjords of Russia
Bodies of water of Murmansk Oblast